The N.V. Vliegtuigbouw 013 Sagitta is a Dutch mid-wing, single-seat Standard Class glider designed by Piet Alsema and produced by N.V. Vliegtuigbouw.

The aircraft is reported by different sources under a variety of different names and designations. Sources label it the Alsema Sagitta, Vliegtuigbouw Sagitta, N.V. Vliegtuigbouw 013 Sagitta, Dutch Sagitta, N.V. Vliegtuigbouw Sagitta 013 and N.V. Vliegtuigbouw Sagitta-013. The US type certificate erroneously lists it as the N.V. VLIEGTUIGBOUW Segitta (sic) 013 and catalogs it in their database under Vilegtuigbouw (sic), N.V., 013.

Design and development
The Sagitta was designed by Alsema between 1957-61 specifically for the then-new FAI Standard Class. Like other early standard class gliders it was quickly surpassed in performance by newer fibreglass aircraft.

The Sagitta has a wooden structure. The fuselage is covered with plywood, the wings and tail surfaces with plywood and doped aircraft fabric covering. The  span wing features top and bottom air brakes and employs NACA 63-618 airfoil at the wing root, and a NACA 4412 section at the wing tip. The controls are automatically connected on assembly. The bubble canopy slides aft for cockpit access and can be locked open in several positions in flight. The landing gear is a fixed monowheel.

In the Netherlands the aircraft was certified for cloud flying and aerobatics, but its US certification does not include these authorizations. The type received its US type certificate on 2 August 1965.

Twenty Sagittas were built.

Operational history
In July 2011 six Sagittas were still registered with the US Federal Aviation Administration.

Variants
Sagitta Prototype first flown on 4 July 1960.
Sagitta 2FAI Standard Class model with  wingspan.
Super Sagitta
FAI Open Class model with  wingspan

Aircraft on display
Aviodrome, Lelystad Airport, Netherlands

Specifications (Sagitta)

See also

Notes

References

External links

Sagitta photos

1960s Dutch sailplanes
Glider aircraft
Aircraft first flown in 1960